The Trust for Retailers and Retail Associates of India (TRRAIN), founded by B. S. Nagesh in 2011, is headquartered in Mumbai and partners with various other non-governmental organisation and corporate entities to provide employment opportunities, skill development to the abled and people with Disabilities.

Organisation 

Ameesha Prabhu is the chief executive officer of the trust.  IL&FS Trust Company are the sole corporate trustees to the Trust.

Projects/Initiatives

TRRAIN Retail Awards 

Trrain Retail Awards, is an initiative aimed at judging customer service stories of retail associates in the industry. The first edition of TRRAIN Retail awards was held in the year 2011 at Mumbai and the latest edition was held in the year 2013. The 2013 edition had more than 3500 retail associates participating out of which 20 Retail Associates were recognised and awarded for delivering Excellence in Customer Service.

References 

2011 establishments in India
Retailing in India
Organizations established in 2011
Retailing organizations